Caroline A. "Carol" Thomson Slowik is an American college track and field coach.  She is the wife of football coach Bob Slowik. A graduate of the University of Delaware, she was "recognized as one of the top women hurdlers of her time." Slowik coached at the University of Florida, Drake, Rutgers and East Carolina and twice was assistant coach of the U.S. Olympic Festival team. Although the university did not field an official track team until 1979, Thomson represented UD and was a national collegiate champion in the 100-metre hurdles, a world record holder in the 60-yard hurdles and American record holder in the 50 and 60-metre indoor hurdles.

References

Delaware Fightin' Blue Hens women's track and field athletes
Florida Gators track and field coaches
American female hurdlers
Year of birth missing (living people)
Living people
Rutgers Scarlet Knights track and field coaches
Drake Bulldogs track and field coaches
East Carolina Pirates track and field coaches